The Popular Alliance was a political alliance in San Marino.

History
The alliance was formed by the Sammarinese Christian Democratic Party (PDCS), the Sammarinese Democratic Socialist Party (PSDS) and some independents, and was opposed by the Committee of Freedom, an alliance of the Sammarinese Socialist Party (PSS) and the Sammarinese Communist Party (PCS). It won 20 of the 60 seats in the Grand and General Council in the 1945 elections. The 1949 elections saw it increase its representation to 25 seats. The 1951 elections saw it win 26 seats.

The alliance was formally abandoned for the 1955 elections. However, following the formation of the Sammarinese Independent Democratic Socialist Party (PSDIS) in 1957 by a merger of the PSDS and a breakaway group from the PSS, the name "Popular Alliance" was used for the coalition of the PDCS with the PSDIS. It was abandoned again in 1973 when the PDCS formed a government with the PSS.

References

Defunct political party alliances in San Marino